Events in the year 1912 in Brazil.

Incumbents

Federal government 
 President: Marshal Hermes da Fonseca 
 Vice President: Venceslau Brás

Governors 
 Alagoas: 
 till 13 March: Euclid Vieira Malta
 13 March - 12 June: Macário das Chagas Rocha Lessa
 from 12 June: Clodoaldo da Fonseca
 Amazonas: Antônio Clemente Ribeiro Bittencourt
 Bahia: Aurélio Rodrigues Viana, then Bráulio Xavier, then José Joaquim Seabra
 Ceará: 
 till 24 January: Antônio Nogueira Accioli
 24 January - 12 July Antônio Frederico de Carvalho Mota
 12 July - 14 July Belisário Cícero Alexandrino
 from 14 July: Marcos Franco Rabelo
 Goiás:
 until March 30: Urbano Coelho de Gouveia
 30 March - 24 May: Joaquim Rufino Ramos Jubé
 from 24 May: Herculano de Sousa Lobo
 Maranhão: Luís Antônio Domingues da Silva
 Mato Grosso: Joaquim Augusto da Costa Marques
 Minas Gerais: Júlio Bueno Brandão
 Pará: João Antônio Luís Coelho
 Paraíba: 
 until 22 October: João Lopes Machado
 from 22 October: João Castro Pinto
 Paraná: 
 Francisco Xavier da Silva
 Carlos Cavalcanti de Albuquerque
 Pernambuco: Emídio Dantas Barreto
 Piauí:
 until 1 July: Antonino Freire da Silva
 from 1 July: Miguel de Paiva Rosa
 Rio Grande do Norte: Alberto Maranhão 
 Rio Grande do Sul: Carlos Barbosa Gonçalves
 Santa Catarina:
 São Paulo: 
 Sergipe:

Vice governors 
 Rio Grande do Norte:
 São Paulo:

Events 
20 September - Clube de Regatas Brasil is founded.
October - Beginning of the Contestado War, a dispute between settlers and landowners.
19 December - The Federal University of Paraná is established.
29 December - The federal government sends in 200 federal troops to deal with ongoing trouble in the State of Santa Catarina.

Births 
24 April - Aymoré Moreira, footballer (died 1998)
13 June - Avelar Brandão Vilela, Archbishop of São Salvador da Bahia (died 1986)
25 June - Carvalho Leite, footballer (died 2004)
29 July - Max Wolff, sergeant killed in World War II (died 1945)
6 August - Adoniran Barbosa, singer and composer (died 1982)
10 August - Jorge Amado, writer (died 2001)
13 December - Luiz Gonzaga, singer, songwriter, and poet (died 1989)
22 December - Alberto Zarzur, footballer (died 1958)

Deaths 
22 October - José Maria de Santo Agostinho, mystic (born 1889; killed by Brazilian state military and police)

References

See also 
1912 in Brazilian football

 
1910s in Brazil
Years of the 20th century in Brazil
Brazil
Brazil